Floriano Peixoto Cordeiro de Farias, known as Floriano Peixoto (born December 10, 1959) is a Brazilian film and television actor from Rio de Janeiro.

In 2000 he married the actress Christine Fernandes, with whom he had a son. The two separated in early 2018.

Career

Television
1993 Agosto - Capitão
1995 Explode Coração - Sarita Vitti
1996 Anjo de Mim - delegado Geraldo
1997 Por Amor - doctor
1998 Dona Flor e Seus Dois Maridos - Otoniel
1998 Pecado Capital - Ernani
2000 Esplendor - Frederico Berger
2001 Estrela-Guia - Ignácio
2002 Sabor da Paixão - Xavier
2003 Kubanacan - Bolívar
2005 América - Antonio Carlos
2005 Carandiru, Outras Histórias - Antonio Carlos
2006 Cidadão Brasileiro - Atílio
2007 Luz do Sol - William Villa Nova
2008 Chamas da Vida - Miguel Costa
2011 Rebelde - Jonas Araripe
2015 Os Dez Mandamentos - Hur
2017 Belaventura - Severo Alencastro Bourbon
2019 Topíssima - Paulo Roberto Mendonça

Film
1994 Veja Esta Canção
1997 A Ostra e o Vento - Roberto
2000 Brava Gente Brasileira - Capitão Pedro
2002 Madame Satã - Gregório
2003 Carandiru - Antônio Carlos
2004 Olga - Filinto Müller

References

External links

Interview at Portal Terra (2005) 

Brazilian male film actors
Brazilian male television actors
1959 births
Living people